Guy Manning (born February 4, 1944) was an American basketball player. He was born in Oakwood, Texas.

Manning played college basketball at Prairie View A&M University from 1962 through 1966. He was elected to membership in the Prairie View A&M University Sports Hall of Fame in 2005.

Manning was drafted by the Baltimore Bullets in the 10th round of the 1966 NBA draft. He played professional basketball in the American Basketball Association, prior to the ABA–NBA merger, with the Houston Mavericks.

References

External links
Basketball-Reference.com Guy Manning page

1944 births
Living people
American men's basketball players
Baltimore Bullets (1963–1973) draft picks
Basketball players from Texas
Houston Mavericks players
People from Oakwood, Texas
Prairie View A&M Panthers basketball players
Small forwards